The 2023 San Antonio FC season is the club's eighth season of existence. Including the San Antonio Thunder of the original NASL and the former San Antonio Scorpions of the modern NASL, it is the 14th season of professional soccer in San Antonio. The club plays in the USL Championship, the second division of the United States soccer league system, and will participate in the U.S. Open Cup. San Antonio are the reigning USL Champions. They are coming off their most successful season in club history in which they captured five trophies; the Copa Tejas, Copa Tejas shield, USLC regular season title, the Western Conference championship, and the USL Championship by beating Louisville City FC 3-1 in the 2022 USL Championship Final.

Club 
 Coaching staff 
{|class="wikitable"
|-
!Position
!Staff

|-

|-

|-

|-

|-

|-

|-

|-

|-

|-

|- Other information 

|-

Squad information

First team squad

Player movement

In

Out

Loan in

Loan out

Pre-season 

The pre-season schedule was released on January 18, 2022, by SAFC.

Competitions

Overall 
Position in the Western Conference

Overview 

{| class="wikitable" style="text-align: center"
|-
!rowspan=2|Competition
!colspan=8|Record
|-
!
!
!
!
!
!
!
!
|-
| USL Championship

|-
| U.S. Open Cup

|-
! Total

USL Championship

Conference table 
Western Conference

Results summary

Results by matchday 

Position in the Western Conference

Matches 
The home opener vs Oakland Roots was announced on January 4, 2023. The remaining 2023 schedule was released on January 9, 2023. Home team is listed first, left to right.

Kickoff times are in CDT (UTC-05) unless shown otherwise

Lamar Hunt U.S. Open Cup

Exhibition 
On February 20, 2023, it was announced that San Antonio would host EFL Championship side Sunderland A.F.C. for an international friendly.

Statistics

Appearances 
Discipline includes league, playoffs, and Open Cup play.

Top scorers 
The list is sorted by shirt number when total goals are equal.

Clean sheets 
The list is sorted by shirt number when total clean sheets are equal.

Summary

Awards

Player

References 

San Antonio FC seasons
San Antonio
San Antonio FC
San Antonio FC